Michael Javier Ortega Dieppa (born 6 April 1991) is a Colombian football midfielder.

Career
Born in Palmar de Varela, Atlántico, Ortega joined Deportivo Cali as youth and rose to the professional team. On 7 March 2010, he made his debut to the senior team. At only 17 years, he played the first 68 minutes of the game against Junior. On 4 August 2009, he made his debut in the Copa Sudamericana. He was starter against Universidad de Chile.

On 10 July 2009, Ortega joined Mexican club Atlas. In 2011, he represented Colombia in the 2011 South American Youth Championship and the 2011 FIFA U-20 World Cup.

On 17 August 2011, Ortega signed for Bundesliga side Bayer 04 Leverkusen on a loan deal from Atlas with the option to sign him in summer of 2013. On 7 August 2012, Bayer Leverkusen loaned Ortega to VfL Bochum.

Michael Ortega joined Atletico Junior in July 2013 permanently for $1 million from Brazilian club Figueirense.

Career statistics

References

External links
 
 

1991 births
Living people
Colombian footballers
Colombia under-20 international footballers
Association football midfielders
Deportivo Cali footballers
Atlas F.C. footballers
Bayer 04 Leverkusen players
VfL Bochum players
Atlético Junior footballers
Figueirense FC players
Once Caldas footballers
Baniyas Club players
Categoría Primera A players
Liga MX players
Bundesliga players
2. Bundesliga players
UAE Pro League players
Colombian expatriate footballers
Expatriate footballers in Mexico
Expatriate footballers in Germany
Expatriate footballers in the United Arab Emirates
Expatriate footballers in Brazil
People from Atlántico Department
21st-century Colombian people